Christmas in Miami is a Nigerian comedy film released on December 24, 2021, and directed by Robert Peters.

Cast 
The lead cast of the film include Ayo Makun, Kent Morita, John Amos, Nadya Marie, Barry piacente, Catherine Olsen, Osita Iheme, Richard Mofe-Damijo and IK Ogbonna.

Production 
The film was produced by Akpos Franchise, Ayo Makun's studio and it has been watched at 61 locations with 49,000 viewers.

Box office 
According to Cinema Exhibitors Association of Nigeria (CEAN), 100 million has been made from the movie within the first week of release.

See also 
Ayo Makun

30 days in Atlanta

A trip to Jamaica

References 

2021 films
English-language Nigerian films
Films shot in Miami
Films shot in Lagos
Nigerian comedy films